Prasophyllum brevilabre, commonly known as the short-lip leek orchid, is a species of orchid endemic to south-eastern Australia. It has a single tubular, green leaf and up to thirty small, greenish-brown flowers with a white labellum. The labellum is sharply turned back on itself so that its tip almost reaches its base.

Description
The flowers are greenish-brown and as with others in the genus, the flowers are inverted so that the labellum is above the column rather than below it. It is turned back on itself so that its tip almost touches its base, and its edges are wavy. Flowering occurs from September to January, most prolifically after fire the previous summer.

Taxonomy and naming
The short-lip leek orchid was first formally described in 1840 by John Lindley who gave it the name Prasophyllum lutescens var. brevilabre and published the description in The genera and species of orchidaceous plants. In 1859 Joseph Dalton Hooker changed the name to Prasophyllum brevilabre. The specific epithet (brevilabre) is derived from the Latin words brevis meaning "short" and labrum meaning "lip".

Distribution and habitat
Prasophyllum brevilabre occurs in south-eastern Queensland, the coastal New South Wales and sometimes as far inland as Mount Kaputar, in the higher rainfall areas of Victoria and is widespread in Tasmania. It grows in a variety of habitats from coastal heath to forest, sometimes in subalpine regions.

References

External links 
 
 

brevilabre
Flora of New South Wales
Flora of Queensland
Flora of Tasmania
Flora of Victoria (Australia)
Endemic orchids of Australia
Plants described in 1840